Namboori Thakur Tilak Varma (born 8 November 2002) is an Indian cricketer. He made his first-class debut for Hyderabad in the 2018–19 Ranji Trophy on 30 December 2018. He made his Twenty20 debut for Hyderabad in the 2018–19 Syed Mushtaq Ali Trophy on 28 February 2019. He made his List A debut on 28 September 2019, for Hyderabad in the 2019–20 Vijay Hazare Trophy.

In December 2019, he was named in India's squad for the 2020 Under-19 Cricket World Cup. In February 2022, he was bought by the Mumbai Indians in the auction for the 2022 Indian Premier League tournament.

Tilak Varma IPl 2023 
The stylish left-handed batsman from Hyderabad has appeared in four first-class matches, sixteen List A matches, and fifteen T20 matches. In the Vijay Hazare Trophy 2021-22, he scored 180 runs in five games and took four wickets.

In the Syed Mushtaq Ali T20 Tournament the previous year, he scored 215 runs with a strike rate of 147.26 runs per game. Varma, a part of India's U19 World Cup squad in 2020, was purchased for 1.7 crore by Mumbai Indians, who faced heavy competition from Sunrisers Hyderabad, Chennai Super Kings, and Rajasthan Royals to get his services.

Tilak Varma Net Worth 
Tilak Varma net worth as of 2023 is 2.4 Crore INR. Tilak Varma has earned his wealth through his cricket contracts, endorsements, and investments in various businesses.

Overall, Tilak Varma’s net worth is a reflection of his success as a cricketer and his smart investments in various businesses. With his continuing success in cricket and his growing business ventures, his net worth is expected to rise even further in the future.

References

External links
 

2002 births
Living people
Indian cricketers
Hyderabad cricketers
Mumbai Indians cricketers
Place of birth missing (living people)